The National Student Lobby (NSL) was a national legislative advocacy group based in Washington, D.C. It was founded in 1971, and merged with the National Student Association to form the United States Student Association (USSA) in 1978.

Defunct organizations based in Washington, D.C.
Student political organizations in the United States
Student organizations established in 1971
1971 establishments in the United States